Pir Jand Halt railway station is located in Pakistan.

See also
 List of railway stations in Pakistan
 Pakistan Railways

References

External links

Railway stations on Shorkot–Lalamusa Branch Line
Railway stations in Gujrat District